Sacred (1997) is a crime novel  by American writer Dennis Lehane, the third book in his Kenzie/Gennaro series.

Plot
Patrick Kenzie and Angela Gennaro are hired by a dying billionaire to find his daughter, Desiree, after the previous detective working the case, Jay Becker, disappeared.

Awards
The novel won the 1998 Nero Award and was nominated for the Shamus Award for "Best Private Eye Novel" in the same year.

References

1997 American novels
Novels by Dennis Lehane
Nero Award-winning works